Seema Malaka is a Buddhist temple in Colombo, Sri Lanka. The temple is mainly used for meditation and rest, rather than for worship. Situated in the Beira Lake, the temple was originally constructed in the late 19th century. Seema Malaka is a part of the Gangaramaya Temple and is situated few hundred meters to its east.

History
Seema Malaka was originally constructed in the late 19th century. The original structure slowly sank into the water in 1970s. In 1976, Sri Lankan architect Geoffrey Bawa was brought in to redesign and construct the temple, which stands today. The reconstruction was funded by a Sri Lankan Muslim businessman, S. H. Moosajee, and his wife, in memory of their son Ameer S. Moosajee.

Construction
Seema Malaka was redesigned by Geoffrey Bawa in 1976 after the original structure slowly sank; the temple is in the middle of the Beira Lake and the design was inspired by the ancient monasteries in forests of Anuradhapura and Ritigala.

The temple is constructed on three platforms over water, which are connected to the mainland and with each other by pontoon bridges. The temple's main roof is covered with blue color tiles and the temple is made from collected spindles and handrails in wooden finishes. The architecture of the edifice resembles the Kandyan era. All three platforms have numerous seated Buddha statues displaying different mudras. The main (central) platform houses wooden paneled shelter for meditation. On one of the side platforms is the Bodhi Tree which was grown from a branch of the Jaya Sri Maha Bodhi tree in Anuradhapura. The four corners of the side platform have small shrines dedicated to Shiva, Vishnu, Kataragama deviyo and Ganesha. A shrine dedicated to Guanyin is found at the entrance to the temple and another statue of Guanyin is also found within the temple complex.

Picture gallery

Location
Seema Malaka is situated in the Beira Lake in Colombo, Sri Lanka.

References

External links
 

Buddhist temples in Colombo
Tourist attractions in Colombo
Geoffrey Bawa buildings